Sgouros (also frequently found as Sguro(s) but even as Guro in some Latin texts, is the name of various notable persons and families in Byzantine and post-Byzantine Greece, attested from 12th century.

Etymology
The word sgouros means "curly-haired" in medieval Greek and is of uncertain etymology. According to Adamantios Korais the etymology is from the Greek word gyros (round).

Notable persons bearing the name 
Surname
Theodore Sgouros, governor of Argos and Nafplio, late 12th century
Leo Sgouros, son of Theodore, autonomous ruler of the NE Peloponnese and Central Greece, early 13th century
Gabriel Sgouros, brother and successor of Leo, surrendered Nafplio to the Crusaders (1212).
George A. Sgouros, Inventor, Industrial & Graphic Designer, Photographer, Independent Candidate for Mayor of Roanoke City, VA (2004 & 2008).
Sgouros, of unknown other name. Participated in the siege of Constantinople (1453) as naval commander, evacuating Christians with his ship.
 Progonos Sgouros (fl. 1294–1300), an Albanian Byzantine noble, member of the Skuraj family. Benefactor of churches and monasteries in Macedonia.
Dimitris Sgouros (born 1969), Greek classical pianist
Angelo Sgouros (born 1977), Greek / American musical producer and recording artist.
Yiannis Sgouros, Greek politician
Given name
Sgouros Spata (fl. 1400-1403), Albanian lord

Modern usage
The name is used as surname in modern Greece, also with derivatives such as Sgouras, Sgouropoulos, Sgourakis, Sgourides, Sgouris etc.

References

Byzantine families
Greek-language surnames
Surnames